Hojjatabad-e Kharaji (also Romanized as Ḩojjatābād-e Kharājī; also known as Ḩojjatābād) is a village in Abnama Rural District, in the Central District of Rudan County, Hormozgan Province, Iran. At the 2006 census, its population was 929, in 194 families.

References 

Populated places in Rudan County